"Chuck Versus the Break-Up" is the third episode of the second season of Chuck. It originally aired on October 13, 2008. Chuck Bartowski is overcome with jealousy when his nemesis Bryce Larkin (Matthew Bomer), Sarah Walker's ex-lover and partner, makes an unexpected return. Chuck and Sarah's growing feelings for each other are tested when their latest mission requires Sarah and Bryce to pose as an extremely affectionate couple. Meanwhile, Morgan Grimes faces his own challenge at Buy More when he must deal with a gang of bullies, the Mighty Jocks. Led by Mitt (Michael Strahan), these bullies are the employees of a neighboring sporting goods store, and they love to take over Buy More's home theater room to play sports video games.

Plot

Main plot
The episode begins in 2005 with Bryce Larkin (Matthew Bomer) and Sarah Walker kissing against a wall in Bogotá, Colombia. As they carry a briefcase, they are chased by Colombian criminals. After Sarah grabs the briefcase, Bryce is held at gunpoint. Sarah agrees to hand over the briefcase, but then shoots the man in the head. In present day, continuing from the previous episode, Chuck Bartowski arrives at Sarah's door wearing a white dinner jacket and carrying a bottle of wine and a single red rose. When she answers the door, however, she is not alone. She is with Bryce, Chuck's old nemesis and her ex-boyfriend. Chuck walks home, throws the rose away, and is given a pep talk by Ellie Bartowski and Devon Woodcomb.

Chuck heads with John Casey to the Orange Orange basement, enters Castle, and meets Sarah for a new mission. A Fulcrum agent has stolen an update for the Intersect from an NSA facility. Bryce has learned that the English software engineer Von Hayes (Steve Valentine) has been hired to decrypt the data on the chip. That night, Bryce and Sarah will attend Von Hayes' party and, much to Chuck's chagrin, pose as a married couple. Chuck will pose as a waiter and waits to flash. The microchip is hidden in the mansion, and Bryce and Sarah will search for it. Chuck learns that they will accomplish this by being "very affectionate". At the yogurt shop, Sarah tells Bryce that they should keep things strictly professional, but Bryce cradles her hand. Outside, Ellie happens to walks by and sees this, making her sad.

Bryce, Sarah and Chuck head to Von Hayes' party, where Hayes toasts himself. In an attempt to flash, Chuck delivers a bottle of wine to Hayes' table. He accidentally spills wine on Hayes' lap while watching Sarah and Bryce dance in an uproariously seductive manner. He then drops a bottle of wine, as they kiss in front of everyone. Hayes fires Chuck, but before he is escorted out, Chuck flashes on the voice of a woman who asks Hayes if he has her microchip. It is revealed that the woman, Juliette (Bianca Chiminello), is a Fulcrum agent who has killed a number of people, but her face is not seen.

When Casey orders him to head back inside to get a look at Juliette, Chuck hides under a table and watches as she shoots Hayes' bodyguard. Hayes panics and drops his keys. Chuck flashes and realizes the microchip is not in his vault, as he told Juliette, but on his key chain. Juliette hears Chuck talking to Casey and holds him at gunpoint. Hayes attempts to escape, but Bryce and Sarah see him. Sarah decides to save Chuck instead, leaving Bryce to go after Hayes, who escapes in his Lamborghini. Sarah gets into a shootout with Juliette, who is driven away by a henchman. Before they escape, Juliette drops a grenade on the road. Sarah sees it and pushes Chuck away, injuring herself in the process.

The next day, Chuck visits Sarah in the hospital. Bryce loiters outside, incognito. Ellie watches on, appalled that Sarah's ex-boyfriend is acting like a stalker. Devon confronts Bryce, who admits to being her ex-boyfriend, but inquires to how serious Chuck and Sarah is. Awesome informs him that they are indeed serious and Sarah confirms that she is in love with Chuck.

Bryce confronts Chuck outside his house. Bryce worries about Sarah, who has left for a mission, and thinks that her feelings for Chuck will get her killed. Chuck assures Bryce that Sarah knows what she is doing. Meanwhile, a henchman shows up at the hospital and is directed to Sarah's room. Awesome gives flowers to Chuck, believing he has intercepted them from Bryce, when they were actually sent from Von Hayes to Sarah. Chuck talks to Hayes, who is scared and needs help, and confirms that he still has the chip.

Later, Chuck tells Casey that he has negotiated the return of the chip. Hayes will meet Chuck and Chuck only, and return the chip in exchange for full immunity and $4.5 million in unmarked bills. Meanwhile, the henchman dresses as a doctor and checks up on Sarah. As he prepares to inject Sarah, she sees that his name tag does not match his face, and attacks him, asking where his boss is.

Chuck and Casey arrive at train station for the meet, Chuck carrying a large duffel bag with the money, and Hayes carrying the chip. They botch the exchange, and Hayes flees when he realizes there are henchman in the station. Hayes runs up the train track, but is surrounded by the men, who hold him at gunpoint. Casey and Bryce arrive and are about to begin a shootout. In the middle of the stand-off, Chuck arrives with the duffel bag and trades the money for Hayes.

While Casey retrieves the money, Chuck and Bryce take Hayes out of the station. Suddenly, Juliette takes Chuck at gunpoint and Hayes again flees. Juliette demands the chip, and Bryce lowers his weapon, noticing Sarah in the background. Sarah aims her gun at Juliette and prepares to save Chuck as she did for Bryce in Bogotá, but finds that cannot take the shot. When Sarah panics, Casey shoots and apprehends Juliette, having retrieved the money and Hayes.

Back at Castle, Sarah admits to letting her guard down, but insists she can protect Chuck. Casey doesn't seem to hear. Chuck meets her outside and insists that they could never have a future together.

Later, Chuck goes into his bedroom and tries on sunglasses left behind by Bryce. Immediately, the glasses begin downloading the Intersect update into Chuck's brain, causing him to fall backwards onto the floor. Chuck closes the episode by expressing his hate for Bryce.

Buy More
At the Buy More, newly appointed assistant manager Lester Patel tells Morgan Grimes to deal with the "Mighty Jocks", employees from neighboring sporting goods store, who are upset over being kicked out of the Buy More video game room. Led by Mitt (Michael Strahan), the bullies demand Sony PSPs, which Morgan nervously agrees to.

When the Mighty Jocks later start trouble while playing sports games in the home theater room, Morgan stands up for himself and pours a drink over Mitt's head. A fight cage match between Morgan and Mitt is then about to start. Anna intervenes, twirling a camera tripods like a jō and defeats Mitt. Casey does a background check on Anna, humorously wondering if she is agent material.

Production
Bryce's sudden reappearance was once again used as a way of derailing Chuck and Sarah's personal relationship.

Flashes
 Chuck flashes on Juliette's voice.
 Chuck flashes on the microchip on Von's keychain.

Cultural references
 Von Hayes' name is an homage to the outfielder who played twelve seasons in Major League Baseball with the Cleveland Indians, Philadelphia Phillies, and California Angels.<ref>"Chuck" Characters Keep Being Named After Ex-Athletes And No One Knows Why: Nerve Blogs</ref>
 Lester tells Morgan to "sweep the leg", referencing The Karate Kid, where Sensei John Kreese (Martin Kove) gives Johnny Lawrence (William Zabka) the same advice to defeat Daniel LaRusso (Ralph Macchio).
 Von Hayes comments on the little amount of leg room in a Lamborghini.
 At both the beginning and end of the episode, Bryce asks Sarah "You got it?" referring to the kill shot on two different villains.  Sarah responds "Yeah, I got it," to which Bryce answers "Take it."  This is a direct reference to a scene featuring Kevin Costner and Andy García in The Untouchables.
 Chuck imitates Sean Connery's accent and says, "Carmichael, Charles Carmichael", referencing James Bond's traditional introduction.
 When Mitt arrives at the Buy More to confront Morgan and Lester, Jeff grabs a camcorder and begins filming. Lester admonishes him, saying, “Jeff! Put that away!” Jeff responds with, “No way! This is just like ‘Faces of Death’ all over again — I’m gonna make a fortune.” This is a reference to the 1978 cult horror film that featured a mix of theatrical and real-life footage to create vignettes of death scenes.
 Chuck says he'd like to call Sarah at the end of a bad day, and "not find out I can't because you're off somewhere in Paraguay quelling a revolution with a fork." This is a reference to Grosse Pointe Blank, where John Cusack's character says "I killed the president of Paraguay with a fork."

Critical response
"Chuck Versus the Break-Up" received positive reviews from critics. Eric Goldman of IGN gave this episode a score of 8 out of 10, writing, "Some might gripe about stretching out any 'Will they or won't they' dynamic, but there's a reason it's such a popular dynamic in TV – it works! The danger is that if you simply have the agonizingly attracted to each other duo hook up, then what? No, you don't necessarily want to keep them apart for the entire run of the show, but putting them together too quickly can kill the sexual tension and the drama. For now, I like how Chuck is treating it."

Steve Heisler of The A.V. Club gave the episode an A, writing "Just as Chuck giveth, Chuck'' can also taketh away. Last week we witnessed Chuck, infused with resolve by his love for Sarah, take a leap forward in his role as a spy (literally), and succeed gloriously. But here we are, one mission later, and things aren't going nearly as well. Where Chuck has flailed in the past by letting his Sarah fixation get in the way of his responsibility, here he fails–truly fails–as a result. It's a big step for the show, and it makes for the best episode yet."

Viewer response was also  positive, the episode drew 6.172 million viewers.

References

External links
 

Break-Up
2008 American television episodes